Polne  is a village in the administrative district of Gmina Słońsk, within Sulęcin County, Lubusz Voivodeship, in western Poland.

See also
Territorial changes of Poland after World War II

References

Polne